The 1937–38 SK Rapid Wien season was the 40th season in club history.

Squad

Squad and statistics

Squad statistics

Fixtures and results

League

Cup

References

1937-38 Rapid Wien Season
Rapid
Austrian football championship-winning seasons